Darna Dam, is a gravity dam on Darna river near Igatpuri, Nashik district in the state of Maharashtra in India.

Specifications

Purpose
 Irrigation...Its purpose is for irrigation and also drinking water supply to nearby town of sinnar, Nashik...

See also
 Dams in Maharashtra
 List of reservoirs and dams in India

References

Dams in Nashik district
Dams completed in 1916
1916 establishments in India